Campbell County Courthouse is a historic county courthouse located at Rustburg, Campbell County, Virginia. It was built in 1848–1849, and is a two-story  T-shaped, brick building in the Greek Revival style.  It features a pedimented portico with four unfluted Doric order columns.  It has a standing-seam metal cross-gable roof with octagonal cupola.

It was listed on the National Register of Historic Places in 1981.

References

County courthouses in Virginia
Courthouses on the National Register of Historic Places in Virginia
Government buildings completed in 1849
Buildings and structures in Campbell County, Virginia
National Register of Historic Places in Campbell County, Virginia
1849 establishments in Virginia